Palm Canyon Wash is an arroyo and tributary ephemeral stream or wash of the Whitewater River, in Riverside County, California.

References

Rivers of Riverside County, California
Geography of the Colorado Desert
Rivers of Southern California
Landforms of Riverside County, California